Evan Niland (born 10 July 1998) is an Irish hurler who plays for Galway Senior Championship club Clarinbridge and at inter-county level with the Galway senior hurling team. He usually lines out as a full-forward.

Career

Niland first came to hurling prominence as a schoolboy with the Presentation College in Athenry, with whom he won three successive Connacht Colleges Championships. He simultaneously lined out with the Clarinbridge club at juvenile and underage levels and was part of the senior team that lost the 2021 Galway SHC final to St Thomas's. Niland first appeared on the inter-county scene as a member of the Galway minor hurling team that beat Tipperary in the 2015 All-Ireland minor hurling final. He later won a Leinster U21 Championship. Niland was drafted onto the Galway senior hurling team in 2019.

Career statistics

Club

Inter-county

Honours
Presentation College, Athenry
Connacht PPS Senior A Hurling Championship: 2014, 2015, 2016

Clarinbridge
Galway Minor A Hurling Championship: 2015, 2016
Galway Under-21 A Hurling Championship: 2018

Galway
National Hurling League: 2021
Leinster Under-21 Hurling Championship: 2018
All-Ireland Minor Hurling Championship: 2015

References

1998 births
Living people
University of Galway hurlers
Clarinbridge hurlers
Galway inter-county hurlers